Francisco Mendes International Airport was an airport located on Santiago Island in Cape Verde. It was opened in 1961. It was located about 2 km east of central Praia in the southeastern part of the island of Santiago. After Cape Verdean independence, the airport was named after Francisco Mendes, a Guinea-Bissau independence activist and that country's first Prime Minister.

History
On 28 September 1998, a TACV de Havilland Canada DHC-6 Twin Otter (registered D4-CAX) carrying Carlos Veiga, then Prime Minister of Cape Verde, 18 other passengers and three crew members crash-landed at the airport. There was one fatality (a bodyguard of the prime minister) and four people were injured.

In late 2005, the airport was deactivated, and replaced by the new Praia International Airport (since 2012 Nelson Mandela International Airport).

References

Defunct airports
Airports in Cape Verde